The tenth and final season of the reality television series Love & Hip Hop: New York first aired on VH1 on December 16, 2019 until March 9, 2020. The show was primarily filmed in New York City, New York and executive produced by Mona Scott-Young, Stephanie R. Gayle and Maricarmen "MC" Lopez for Monami Entertainment and Dan Cesareo, Lucilla D'Agostino, Donna Edge-Rachell, Kimberly Osorio, Shelley Sinha and Michael Carrozza for Big Fish Entertainment. Nina L. Diaz, Lashan Browning and Phakiso Collins are executive producers for VH1.

Production
On September 12, 2019, it was reported that several former cast members had begun filming the show for its tenth anniversary season, with Big Fish Entertainment taking over the show from Eastern TV. After a seven-year hiatus, Chrissy Lampkin and Jim Jones would return to franchise, along with Olivia Longott, Somaya Reece, Erica Mena and Tahiry Jose. New cast members would include rappers Jennaske, Phresher and his girlfriend Jenn Coreano. Danny García and Erica Mendez were also initially reported as cast members and Emily Bustamante was reportedly in talks to return but ultimately did not appear. Mama Jones, Cisco Rosado and Peter Gunz would return later in the season.

On November 4, 2019, VH1 announced Love & Hip Hop: New York would be returning for a tenth season on December 16, 2019, along with a teaser with the tagline "the homecoming begins", confirming Chrissy's return. On December 6, 2019, VH1 released a five-minute supertrailer. This season featured an entirely new opening credits sequence. As with last season, couples in the cast are credited together (in this instance, Remy Ma and Papoose, and Erica Mena and Safaree).

The season was planned to air in two parts, for the first time in the show's history. Part one of the season aired from December 16, 2019 until March 9, 2020, while part two was set to air in spring. On an episode of his podcast, released on March 26, 2020, Joe Budden confirmed the show was still filming, despite the COVID-19 pandemic. However, he refused to continue filming and potentially risk his health, telling a producer, "There’s no Joe story to continue right now. I’ve closed things with Cyn. I’ve closed things with everybody. There is nothing for me to report to right this second. And if there was, I wouldn’t come." The remaining episodes of the season were eventually postposed indefinitely due to the virus.

Synopsis

Cast

Starring
 Yandy Smith-Harris (13 episodes)
 Joe Budden (10 episodes)
 Rich Dollaz (11 episodes)
 Kimbella Vanderhee (9 episodes)
 Remy Ma (10 episodes)
 Papoose (12 episodes)
 Cyn Santana (13 episodes)
 Chrissy Lampkin (11 episodes)
 Erica Mena (12 episodes)
 Safaree Samuels (12 episodes)

Also starring
 Jonathan Fernandez (12 episodes)
 Tahiry Jose (10 episodes)
 Juju C. (6 episodes)
 Phresher (10 episodes)
 Jennaske (4 episodes)
 Jenn Coreano (9 episodes)
 Jim Jones (8 episodes)
 Olivia Longott (4 episodes) 
 Somaya Reece (2 episodes)
 Mama Jones (2 episodes)
 Cisco Rosado (3 episodes)
 Peter Gunz (2 episodes)

DJ Drewski, Judy Harris and Amina Buddafly return in guest roles, while Sky Landish, Mariahlynn and Anaís appear in uncredited cameos. Mendeecees Harris and Juelz Santana appear via phone call conversations with Yandy and Kimbella, as they were incarcerated during filming. The show also features minor appearances from notable figures within the hip hop industry and New York's social scene, including Fat Joe, Ras Baraka, Cory Gunz, DJ Kay Slay and Love & Hip Hop: Atlantas Karlie Redd and Sierra Gates.

Episodes

Webisodes

VH1: UnVeiled
The season was preceded by VH1: UnVeiled, a web series featuring in-depth interviews with former and current Love & Hip Hop: New York cast members, which were released weekly from November 19, 2019.

Check Yourself
Love & Hip Hop New York: Check Yourself, which features the cast's reactions to each episode, was released weekly with every episode on digital platforms.

Bonus scenes
Deleted scenes from the season's episodes were released weekly as bonus content on VH1's official website.

References

External links

2019 American television seasons
2020 American television seasons
Love & Hip Hop